Abigail Folsom (born 18 May 1795 and died 8 August 1867) was a 19th-century American feminist and abolitionist. Born Abigail Harford, she married Peter Folsom, who ran a saddler's shop out of their home, on May 29, 1825. One historian of Rochester called her "notorious" for her outbursts in church. Within a few years, she would leave him – possibly due to his excessive drinking – and move to Boston. Ralph Waldo Emerson termed her "the flea of conventions" for her habit of insisting on a woman's right to speak, which would derail abolitionist and other conferences.  One source relates the following anecdote:

She was often removed from the halls she afflicted by gentle force. As she was a nonresistant, she never struck back, save with her tongue which was keen enough. One day Wendell Phillips and two others placed her in a chair and were carrying her down the aisle through the crowd when she exclaimed: "I'm better off than my master was. He had but one ass to ride — I have three to carry me."

Accounts of her speeches – and the "sensations" they engendered – often appeared in antebellum newspapers, and she frequently shared a stage with prominent black activists like Frederick Douglass. She became famous as a reformer and as one of the earliest women lecturers in the United States. She was also known to go into courts, prisons, and jails to advocate for those on trial and then, upon their release, take them into her own home and help them find jobs. Folsom often attended meetings of the state legislature, and there as at other public gatherings in halls or churches, it was "impossible to keep her silent if anything was said that displeased her."

Notes

Further reading
 Morris, Charles E. III "'Our Capital Aversion': Abigail Folsom, Madness, & Radical Antislavery Praxis" Women's Studies in Communication 22 March 2001

External links
 Folsom Family Genealogy Records at Dartmouth College Library

1795 births
1867 deaths
American feminists
American abolitionists